İmircik is a village in the Vezirköprü district of Samsun Province, Turkey.

References

Villages in Vezirköprü District